This is a List of South American Championships medalists in sailing.

470

49er

49er FX

RS:X

Men

Women and Youth

Soling

Star

See also
SASC

References

Sailing-related lists